The 1968 Long Beach State 49ers football team represented California State College, Long Beach—now known as California State University, Long Beach—as a member of the California Collegiate Athletic Association (CCAA) during the 1968 NCAA College Division football season. Led by Don Reed in his 11th and final season as head coach, the 49ers compiled an overall record of 3–7 with a mark of 1–4 in conference play, tying for fourth place in the CCAA. The team played home games at Veterans Memorial Stadium adjacent to the campus of Long Beach City College in Long Beach, California.

Schedule

References

Long Beach State
Long Beach State 49ers football seasons
Long Beach State 49ers football